"Did It On'em" is a song by Trinidadian-American rapper and singer Nicki Minaj. It was written by Minaj with J. Ellington, Safaree Samuels, and Shondrae "Bangladesh" Crawford, who produced the track. The song served as the sixth single from her debut album, Pink Friday, in the United States.

The song has a distinct sound when compared to the rest of the tracks on the album as it contains a harder, "massive, ungainly" beat, reflecting her prior work on mixtapes. It also features hi-hats in "overdrive" and multiple synth patterns sounding as if a car-alarm siren was going off. Lyrically, Minaj delivers explicit phrases talking about winning over her competition.

"Did It On'em" reached number forty-nine on the US Billboard Hot 100, and reached number 3 on the US R&B/Hip-Hop Songs and number 4 on US Rap Songs charts. A music video was released for the track, featuring Minaj behind-the-scenes and performing on the I Am Still Music Tour.

Composition
"Did It On'em" is a hardcore hip hop and post-dubstep song that has instrumentally been described as having a massive, ungainly beat. Producer Bangladesh creates hi-hats that have been described as on overdrive. Multiple synths are heard on the track that have been described as blowing up like "a car-alarm siren." One of Minaj's more lyrically explicit songs, the lyrics speak of Minaj winning over her competition, in phrases such as saying she "shitted on 'em" or "pissed on 'em." Brad Wete of Entertainment Weekly said Minaj was "ordering her Barbies to put up two fingers if they're crapping on their competition." Mark Hogan of Spin also reviewed the lyrics, commenting "she pulls out an imagined 'dick' and pisses on a washed-up rival."

Reception
Scott Plagenhoef of Pitchfork gave the song a positive review naming it the record's best track, due to the fact that it features Minaj going "toe-to-toe with a huge beat." Additionally from Pitchfork, Tom Breihan stated that Minaj's voice is meant more for rapping than singing and favored "Did It On'em" on that thought. Breihan continued complimenting Minaj, stating that the song recognizes how "beautifully, effortlessly weird she is," and how she is willing to "contort her voice and persona into pretzel shapes just to induce that oh-shit face in anyone listening." Margaret Wappler of Los Angeles Times called the song "aggressively scatological," and compared the song to the Bangladesh-produced "A Milli" from label-mate Lil Wayne, stating that it fares better musically.

In a list of the "50 Best songs of 2010" by Rolling Stone, "Did It On'em" came in a number twenty-five additionally stating that the song is a "hazy, synapse-butchering throwdown." Marc Hogan of Spin stated that the track features Minaj's "best rapping". Sam Wolfson of New Musical Express stated that the song is so vulgar that Minaj could have permanently placed herself on the "Teen Choice Awards blacklist," adding that the song is a "post-dubstep cry."

Chart performance
The song peaked at number forty-nine on the US Billboard Hot 100 and spent sixteen weeks on the chart. It also peaked inside the top five of the Billboard component charts Hot R&B/Hip-Hop Songs and Rap Songs, reaching number three on the previous and number four on the latter chart.

Music video
In April 2011, during an interview with KIIS-FM's DJ JoJo, Minaj revealed that she had shot a music video for "Did It On'em". In an interview with MTV News on May 31, 2011, Director DJ Scoob Doo revealed that Minaj and himself pieced the video together within two weeks. In an interview with MTV News on May 31, 2011, director DJ Scoob Doo discussed the music video's styling and development:

"She's family to me and I'm family to her, but this is the first time us working together was a priority on both of our lists. So we just had to dig in and put everything to the side and really work on something ... [and] we had no idea that it would turn out as good as it did. It was a great experience[...] It took me about a good two weeks to put all of the ideas that we had together. The good thing about the video is that we went in knowing we were gonna shoot the video onstage a few times. I was actually able to get my camera crew onstage"

The video premiered exclusively to fans with accounts on Minaj's official website on May 27, 2011, and later premiered worldwide. It was directed by Young Money affiliate DJ Scoob Doo and watched over 5 million times.
The video is compiled of clips from the I Am Still Music Tour, backstage moments with Drake and Lil' Wayne, and candids of past photo shoots. Additionally, it features Minaj performing the track on stage, a stream of magazine photo shoots cut together with footage of Minaj signing fans' chests, and perfecting the "helicopter" move with a nearby dildo. A clean version was later shot removing the dildo scenes. Minaj stated the video was a gesture of gratitude to her fans for their support for her on the I Am Still Music Tour.

Live performances
Minaj has performed the song on both her debut concert tour, the Pink Friday Tour, and her Pink Friday: Reloaded Tour. She also performed it as part of The Nicki Wrld Tour.

Credits and personnel
Credits are taken from Pink Friday liner notes.

Nicki Minaj – vocals, writer
Shondrae "Bangladesh" Crawford – producer

Charts

Weekly charts

Year-end charts

Certifications

Release history

References

2011 singles
Nicki Minaj songs
Song recordings produced by Bangladesh (record producer)
Songs written by Nicki Minaj
Cash Money Records singles
Songs written by Bangladesh (record producer)
2010 songs
Songs written by Safaree Samuels